Eddy Kurniawan (born 2 July 1962 in Semarang, Central Java) is a retired Chinese-Indonesian male badminton player.

Career
Kurniawan's prime years, the mid to late 1980s, were a period of Chinese domination of international men's singles competition. Though he frequently appeared in the later rounds of major international tournaments, the hard-fighting Kurniawan rarely won them. One exception was his victory at the 1990 World Badminton Grand Prix, where he defeated Malaysia's Rashid Sidek in the final. He won the Australian Open in 1992. Kurniawan was a bronze medalist at the 1989 IBF World Championships in Jakarta. Perhaps the highlight of his career was his performance at the 1989 Sudirman Cup (combined men's and women's team world championship) when his victories over Korean opponents in both singles and mixed doubles in the last two matches of the contest secured the title for Indonesia.

Achievements

IBF World Championships 
Men's Singles

World Cup 
Men's singles

Asian Championships 
Men's singles

Southeast Asian Games 
Men's singles

International Tournaments 
Men's singles

External links
 
 

Indonesian male badminton players
Living people
Asian Games medalists in badminton
Badminton players at the 1986 Asian Games
Asian Games bronze medalists for Indonesia
Southeast Asian Games medalists in badminton
Southeast Asian Games silver medalists for Indonesia
1962 births
Medalists at the 1986 Asian Games
Competitors at the 1985 Southeast Asian Games
Competitors at the 1987 Southeast Asian Games
Competitors at the 1989 Southeast Asian Games
People from Semarang
Sportspeople from Central Java
20th-century Indonesian people